The Sporting News Reliever of the Year Award was an annual award presented to the best relief pitcher in each league in Major League Baseball (MLB). At the time, no reliever had ever received a Cy Young Award vote. The Fireman of the Year Award originally recognized the reliever with the most combined saves and wins in each league in MLB. The magazine had started publishing the then-unofficial save statistic that same year. Later, a save was worth two points compared to one for a save in determining the winner. In  the award was chosen based on consensus from TSN editors, and it was renamed to Reliever of the Year Award. The award was last issued in 2010 before being discontinued.

Fireman of the Year Award winners

Reliever of the Year Award winners

See also

Major League Baseball Reliever of the Year Award
 also known as the Mariano Rivera AL Reliever of the Year Award and Trevor Hoffman NL Reliever of the Year Award
Rolaids Relief Man of the Year Award (discontinued)
"Esurance MLB Awards" Best Pitcher (in MLB)
"Players Choice Awards" Outstanding Pitcher
Warren Spahn Award (best left-handed pitcher)
Baseball awards
List of Major League Baseball awards
Sporting News Starting Pitcher of the Year
Sporting News Relief Pitcher of the Year
Sporting News Player of the Year
Sporting News Rookie of the Year
Sporting News Comeback Player of the Year
Sporting News Manager of the Year
Sporting News Executive of the Year

References
General

Specific

Major League Baseball trophies and awards

Awards established in 1960
Awards disestablished in 2011